The 1994–95 All-Ireland Senior Club Football Championship was the 25th staging of the All-Ireland Senior Club Football Championship since its establishment by the Gaelic Athletic Association in 1970-71. The championship began on 2 October 1994 and ended on 17 March 1995.

Nemo Rangers were the defending champions, however, they failed to qualify after being beaten by Castlehaven in the semi-final of the 1994 Cork County Championship.

On 17 March 1995, Kilmacud Crokes won the championship following an 0-08 to 0-05 defeat of Bellaghy in the All-Ireland final at Croke Park. It was their first ever championship title.

Results

Connacht Senior Club Football Championship

Quarter-final

Semi-finals

Final

Leinster Senior Club Football Championship

First round

Quarter-finals

Semi-finals

Final

Munster Senior Club Football Championship

First round

Semi-finals

Final

Ulster Senior Club Football Championship

Preliminary round

Quarter-finals

Semi-finals

Final

All-Ireland Senior Club Football Championship

Quarter-final

Semi-finals

Final

Championship statistics

Miscellaneous

 Tuam Stars won the Connacht Club Championship title for the first time in their history.

References

1994 in Gaelic football
1995 in Gaelic football